is an urban park in Naha, Okinawa. The park was opened by the city in December 2015. An opening inauguration ceremony was held on January 8, 2016 in Yamashita Town, Naha. The  park was created through private land purchases by the city which cost an estimated 100 million yen.

History 
Prior to becoming a park, Naha City Yamashita Cave 1, a prefectural historic site on Okinawa Island designated in 1969 and where Yamashita Cave Man was excavated, rested within what are now the boundaries of Yamashita First Cave Site Park. During the opening inauguration ceremony, Naha City Assembly member Toru Kinjo stated that it was rare for ruins to become a park.

Features

Historic landmark 

The oldest fragmentary human remains in Okinawa Prefecture were discovered to be the Yamashita Cave Man found inside Naha City Yamashita Cave 1.

Facilities 
Facilities in the park include playground equipment for toddlers and exercise equipment for adults as well as a covered bench. There are also restrooms on site for men, women, and people with disabilities.

See also 
 List of Historic Sites of Japan (Okinawa)
 Yamashita Cave Man

References

External links 

 Yamashita First Cave Site Park official website 
 Yamashita First Cave Site Park visual tour 

Parks and gardens in Okinawa Prefecture
Archaeological sites in Japan